Dodge Gulch is a valley located near Westport in Mendocino County, California.

References

Valleys of Mendocino County, California
Valleys of California